The following is a list of awards and nominations received by filmmaker Paul Thomas Anderson.

Paul Thomas Anderson is an American film director, producer, screenwriter and cinematographer. He has received eleven Academy Award nominations. He was nominated for the Best Original Screenplay for the drama focusing on the porn industry during the 1970s Boogie Nights (1997), and the psychological drama Magnolia (1999). He received three nominations for Best Picture, Best Director, and Best Adapted Screenplay for his epic period drama There Will Be Blood (2007). He also received nominations for psychedelic crime film Inherent Vice (2014), and costume drama Phantom Thread (2017). He also has received a Golden Globe Award nomination, eight British Academy Film Award nominations, and a Grammy Award nomination. He received a Independent Spirit Robert Altman Award for Inherent Vice in 2015.

As of 2022, Anderson is one of the few filmmakers to earn more than ten nominations without a win for the Academy Awards.

Major associations

Academy Awards

British Academy Film Awards

Golden Globe Awards

Grammy Awards

Critics awards

Film festival awards

Berlin International Film Festival

Cannes Film Festival

Venice Film Festival

Other awards and nominations

AACTA International Awards

Critics' Choice Movie Awards

Directors Guild of America Awards

Independent Spirit Awards

Producers Guild of America Awards

Writers Guild of America Awards

Awards received by Anderson movies

Direction for Oscar-related performances
Anderson has directed multiple Oscar nominated performances.

References

Anderson, Paul Thomas